Stamatis is a given name and surname of Greek origin, a diminutive of Stamatios (Σταμάτιος). Notable people with the name Stamatis include:

Given name

Stamatis Benas (born 1985), Greek basketball player
Stamatis Kalamiotis (born 1990), Greek footballer
Stamatis Katsimis (born 1982), Greek racing driver
Stamatis Kraounakis (born 1955), Greek music composer, producer, lyricist, writer and director
Stamatis Krestenitis (d. 1823), Greek revolutionary leader
Stamatis Sapalidis (born 1990), Greek professional footballer 
Stamatis Spanoudakis (born 1948), Greek classical composer
Stamatis Voulgaris (1779-1842), Greek urban planner

Surname
Alexis Stamatis (born 1960), Greek novelist, playwright and poet
Andreas Stamatis (born 1993), Greek footballer
Dimitrios Stamatis (disambiguation), multiple people
Jim Stamatis (born 1958), retired American soccer forward

References

Greek masculine given names
Surnames